Joseph Grafton (June 9, 1757 in Newport, Rhode Island – December 16, 1836) was a founder of the Newton Theological Institution. For more than forty-eight years he was pastor of the First Baptist Church in Newton, Massachusetts. He was succeeded by the Rev. Frederic Augustus Willard. As the minister of a member church of the (Baptist) Warren Association, Grafton served on committees to advise individuals and churches who were taxed in order to pay the town-supported Congregational minister's salary. He also served as a messenger to associations in other states such as Connecticut and Maine.

In September 1793, members of the Warren Association elected Joseph Grafton as one of twelve founding Trustees of the Baptist Education Fund. The purpose of the fund was to help young men pay for tuition to colleges such as Rhode Island College (Brown University).

Upon his death, the Rev. Daniel Sharp preached a funeral sermon. Grafton's biography, written by Samuel Francis Smith, was published in Boston in 1849.

Notes and references

Further reading
 Sprague, William Buell, "Joseph Grafton", Annals of the American Pulpit: Baptist. 1860, New York, Robert Carter and brothers, 1860.
 Smith, Samuel Francis, Life of the Rev. Joseph Grafton, late pastor of the First Baptist church, Newton, Ms ..., Boston, J. Putnam, 1849.

External links
 First Baptist Church, Newton, Massachusetts website

1757 births
1836 deaths
18th-century Baptist ministers from the United States
19th-century Baptist ministers from the United States